"Go to work on an egg" was an advertising slogan used by the United Kingdom's Egg Marketing Board during the 1950s and 1960s as part of more than £12 million it spent on advertising, including a series of television adverts starring the comedian Tony Hancock and actress Patricia Hayes in 1965. The commercials were created by British director, Len Fulford. The proposition was that having an egg for breakfast was the best way to start the working day. Author Fay Weldon helped to create the campaign, and is supposed to have come up with the slogan. The concept of toast "soldiers" with boiled eggs seems to have been popularised, or possibly invented, for the 1965 series.

In 2007, plans to rebroadcast the original television adverts were rejected by the Broadcast Advertising Clearance Centre, which observed that the adverts did not suggest a varied diet. The advert was instead made available on an anniversary website.

References

External links
 Go to work on an egg - 50th anniversary website
 Campaign poster

British advertising slogans
British cuisine
Eggs (food)
Eggs in culture
1950s neologisms